Peter G. Kelly (born 1938), also known as Peter Galbraith Kelly Sr., is an American lobbyist and political consultant. He received the 2015 Luminary Award in The World Affairs Council of CT.

Education
After education at Georgetown University and Yale Law School. Kelly founded his own law firm, Updike, Kelly and Spellacy.

Career
He served as the Democratic National Committee treasurer (1979–1981) and finance chair (1981–1985). He served as senior political advisor to Al Gore in 1988 and 2000, Bill Clinton in 1992 and 1996, and John Kerry in 2004.

Kelly was a founding partner Black, Manafort, Stone and Kelly (BMSK) and its successor, Black, Kelly, Scruggs & Healey (BKSH & Associates), one of the most powerful lobbying firms in the United States, owned by public relations powerhouse Burson-Marsteller.

Activity in international relations

After retiring from BKSH, Kelly worked with The PBN Company, has served as Vice Chairman of International Foundation for Election Systems (IFES), as director and treasurer for the National Democratic Institute, and as managing director of Burson-Marsteller in Latin America. He is a former Chairman of IFES's Board.

Personal life

References

External links

1938 births
Living people
American lobbyists
Washington, D.C., Democrats
Democratic National Committee treasurers